Merhawi Kudus Ghebremedhin (born 23 January 1994 in Asmara) is professional Eritrean cyclist, who currently rides for UCI WorldTeam . He was named in the start list for the 2015 Tour de France, becoming one of the first two black Africans to start the Tour alongside teammate and countryman Daniel Teklehaimanot. At the age of 21 Kudus was the youngest rider in the race. He was named in the start list for the 2016 Giro d'Italia.

He competed in the men's road race at the 2020 Summer Olympics.

Major results

2012
 6th Overall Tour of Rwanda
1st Stage 1
2013
 1st  Mountains classification La Tropicale Amissa Bongo
 African Road Championships
2nd  Under-23 road race
3rd  Road race
 2nd Overall Tour of Eritrea
1st Stage 4
 2nd Overall Vuelta Ciclista a León
1st  Young rider classification
 6th Asmara Circuit
 8th Overall Fenkil Northern Red Sea Challenge
2014
 2nd Overall Tour de Langkawi
 3rd Overall Mzansi Tour
 5th Overall Route du Sud
1st  Young rider classification
2015
 African Road Championships
1st  Team time trial
1st  Under-23 time trial
2nd  Under-23 road race
5th Time trial
9th Road race
 10th Giro dell'Emilia
 10th Trofeo Serra de Tramuntana
2016
 3rd Time trial, National Road Championships
 6th Trofeo Serra de Tramuntana
 9th Overall Tour of Oman
2017
 3rd Road race, National Road Championships
 4th Overall Tour of Oman
1st  Young rider classification
 9th Overall Vuelta a Burgos
 9th Overall Volta a la Comunitat Valenciana
2018
 1st  Road race, National Road Championships
 7th Overall Vuelta a Burgos
 9th Overall Tour of Oman
2019
 1st  Overall Tour du Rwanda
1st Stages 2 & 3
 3rd Time trial, National Road Championships
 3rd Overall Tour of Turkey
 6th Road race, African Road Championships
 8th Giro della Toscana
2020
 8th Overall Settimana Internazionale di Coppi e Bartali
2021 
 National Road Championships
1st  Time trial
2nd Road race
 2nd Overall Adriatica Ionica Race
 5th Overall Presidential Tour of Turkey
 8th Overall Route d'Occitanie
2022
  National Road Championships
1st  Road race
2nd Time trial

Grand Tour general classification results timeline

References

External links

1994 births
Living people
Eritrean male cyclists
Olympic cyclists of Eritrea
Cyclists at the 2020 Summer Olympics
Sportspeople from Asmara